Tuning Nunatak is a small rock nunatak 1 nautical mile (1.9 km) north of Darling Ridge, Ohio Range. Surveyed by the United States Antarctic Research Program (USARP) Horlick Mountains Traverse party in December 1958. Named by Advisory Committee on Antarctic Names (US-ACAN) for Preston O. Tuning, meteorologist at Byrd Station in 1960.

Nunataks of Marie Byrd Land